Prince Zhong of the Second Rank, or simply Prince Zhong, was the title of a princely peerage used in China during the Manchu-led Qing dynasty (1644–1912). As the Prince Zhong peerage was not awarded "iron-cap" status, this meant that each successive bearer of the title would normally start off with a title downgraded by one rank vis-à-vis that held by his predecessor. However, the title would generally not be downgraded to any lower than a feng'en fuguo gong except under special circumstances.

The first bearer of the title was Yihe (奕詥; 1844–1868), the eighth son of the Daoguang Emperor. In 1850, Yihe was granted the title "Prince Zhong of the Second Rank" by his father. The title was passed down over two generations and held by three persons.

Members of the Prince Zhong peerage
 Yihe (奕詥; 1844–1868), the Daoguang Emperor's eighth son, held the title Prince Zhong of the Second Rank from 1850 to 1868, posthumously honoured as Prince Zhongduan of the Second Rank (鍾端郡王)
 Zaiying (載瀅; 1861–1909), Yixin's second son and Yihe's adopted son, held the title of a beile from 1868 to 1900, made an acting junwang in 1889, stripped of his title in 1900
 Zaitao (1887–1970), Yixuan's seventh son and Yihe's adopted son, held the title of a second class zhenguo jiangjun from 1890 to 1894, promoted to buru bafen fuguo gong in 1894, made an acting beizi in 1898, promoted to beile in 1902 and made an acting junwang in 1908
 Pujia (溥佳; 1908–1949), Zaitao's son
 Yuyin (毓崟; 1927–?), Pujia's son

Family tree

See also
 Prince Gong (peerage)
 Prince Chun (醇)
 Prince Hui (first rank)
 Royal and noble ranks of the Qing dynasty

References
 

Qing dynasty princely peerages